Rashmi Kumari is an International Carrom champion from Bihar, India, playing since 1992. She is employed on a scholarship basis at Union Bank of India, UBI in Patna. She also played for BSB in many tournaments.

Achievements
World champion Rashmi Kumari of Petroleum Sports Promotion Board and L Rakesh Singh of Air India won the men's and women's titles in the 17th Inter-Institution National Carrom Championship in Mumbai.

National
 Runner up: Sub junior national in 1993, 1994, and 1995; Junior national in 1995 and 1998; Senior national in 2000 and 2002.
 Winner: Sub-junior in 1997; Junior national at Pakistan in 2000; Senior national in 2004;2005,2007,2010,2011,2012,2013,2014 (eight times)

International
 Winner 4th World Cup Carrom Championship in 2014 at Maldives
 Winner: 6th World Carrom Championship in 2012 at Sri-Lanka,  10th,15th &17th SAARC Countries Carrom Championship in 2006, 2011 & 2013 at Sri Lanka, Maldives, and India.  2nd, 3rd and 5th Asian Carrom Championship in 2007, 2009 & 2013 at Pune (India), Raipur (India) and Kolkata (India). 5th &6th ICF CUP Carrom Championship in 2008 & 2012 at Sri Lanka & Malaysia. 1st Malaysia Open in 1999; 3rd World Carrom Championship in 2000 at Delhi; 1st World Cup in Luton (U.K.) in 2001

Awards and honours
Ambedkar Sports and cultural Award 1995, 1996 and 1997.
Felicitation by Bihar State Sports, Youth and Cultural Dept., 1996, 2001, 2003, 2004, 2005, 2006, 2007, 2008, 2009, 2010, and 2011.
Swami Vivekanand Youth Award 1999.

References

https://web.archive.org/web/20071224110156/http://psca.ca.pn/
https://web.archive.org/web/20090416184114/http://sportal.nic.in/front.asp?maincatid=51&headingid=71

Indian carrom players
Living people
Year of birth missing (living people)
Sportswomen from Bihar
Place of birth missing (living people)
Sportspeople from Patna
Game players from Bihar